Edmund Page (by 1512 – 1551), of Shorne, Kent, was an English politician.

He was a Member of Parliament (MP) for Rochester in 1529.

References

1551 deaths
People from Shorne
English MPs 1529–1536
Year of birth uncertain